John Darling may refer to:
John Darling (comic strip), a comic strip published 1979 to 1990
John P. Darling (1815–1882), American politician from New York
John Darling Sr. (1831–1916), politician in South Australia and businessman
John Darling Jr. (1852–1914), politician in South Australia and company director
John Darling (Peter Pan), a character in Peter Pan
John Darling and Son, an Australian wheat merchant and flour milling company, formed by John Darling, Sr

Darling, John